Harry Skinner may refer to:

Harry Skinner (dancer), dancer with the Royal New Zealand Ballet
Harry Skinner (ethnologist) (1886–1978), New Zealand soldier, ethnologist, university lecturer, museum curator, and librarian
Harry Skinner (footballer) (fl. 1878–?), English professional footballer
Harry Skinner (politician) (1855–1929), U.S. Representative from North Carolina

See also
 Henry Skinner (disambiguation)